Shakoh (also Sakoh ( शकोह ), Jaisinghpur) is a village panchayat, of Lambagaon block, Jaisinghpur tehsil of the Kangra district  of Himachal Pradesh, in India. It is located in the border area of the Kangra-Hamirpur district. It is the central point to Hamirpur (37Km) and Palampur (44 Km). Shakoh is just 7 km away from Sujanpur Tira, a sub-town in the Hamirpur district, where Sainik School of Himachal is located. Kangra is one of twelve districts in Himachal Pradesh. Pin Code of Shakoh Village is 176 082 and the people of Shakoh village use the Pahadi dialect (Kangri).

Shakoh is the nearby village, which connects Jaisinghpur tehsil and further connects triple border of Hamirpur, Mandi, and Kangra (tri-border juncture).

Places
Kali Mata Temple, Shakoh, Jaisinghpur
Government Middle School, Shakoh

Gallery

References

Kangra, Himachal Pradesh